Uneasy Paradise is a 1963 Australian television film directed by William Sterling. It is a 60-minute drama set in Melbourne about a gambler married to Sally. He loses much money at a club run by Paolo.

Australian drama was relatively rare at the time.

Premise
Neville is a gambler married to Sally. He loses much money at a club run by Paolo.

Cast
Peter Aanensen as Neville
Terri Aldred as Sally
Syd Conabere as Billy
Edward Howell as Paolo
Jules Caffari as Gambler
James Lynch
Douglas Kelly
Ian Boyce
Roly Barlee
Ron Pinnell
Stewart Weller
Lewis Tegart
Ray Angel

Production
The show was written by Melbourne writer Laurence Collinson. It was based on a true story and was written as part of a challenge by Sterling at a UNESCO conference in Adelaide. William Sterling decided to treat the subject matter "neo-realistically".

Reception
The Sydney Morning Herald wrote that the plot "carried a spell of authenticity which was broken only by a contrived and comfortable ending" in which Sterling's production "exploited camera angles and action scenes vividly enough to make the-television medium, seem eminently suitable for an effective if somewhat sordid play that took all the tricks except the final, one of a satisfactory, ending."

The Age criticised the writing saying, "every development could be telegraphed."

See also
List of live television plays broadcast on ABC (1956–1969)

References

External links
Uneasy Paradise on IMDb
Uneasy Paradise at National Film and Sound Archive

1963 television films
Australian television films
Australian Broadcasting Corporation original programming
English-language television shows
Black-and-white Australian television shows
1963 films
Films directed by William Sterling (director)